Wen Boss Mukubu (born August 2, 1983) is a Congolese-born Belgian professional basketball player for Kangoeroes Mechelen. He has also played for the Belgian national team, with whom he participated at the EuroBasket 2015.

Professional career
In May 2021, Mukubu signed with Kangoeroes Mechelen.

References

1983 births
Living people
Arkansas Razorbacks men's basketball players
BCM Gravelines players
Belgian men's basketball players
Cocodrilos de Caracas players
Democratic Republic of the Congo men's basketball players
Democratic Republic of the Congo expatriates in Belgium
JA Vichy-Clermont Métropole players
Kangoeroes Basket Mechelen players
Liège Basket players
Limburg United players
Pistoia Basket 2000 players
Power forwards (basketball)
RBC Pepinster players
SIG Basket players
Small forwards
Spirou Charleroi players
Basketball players from Kinshasa
STB Le Havre players
Sutor Basket Montegranaro players
UAB Blazers men's basketball players